From Jewish Folk Poetry, Op. 79, is a song cycle for soprano, contralto, tenor and piano (or orchestra) by Dmitri Shostakovich.   It uses texts taken from the collection Jewish folk songs, compiled by I. Dobrushin and A. Yuditsky, edited by Y. M. Sokolov (Goslitizdat, 1947).

The cycle is just one of many works by Shostakovich to incorporate elements of Jewish music; he said that he was attracted by "a jolly melody on sad intonations". The first 8 songs of the piano version was composed in August of 1948, after Shostakovich's denunciation in the Zhdanov decree of that year. 3 more songs was added in October of 1948, which demonstrate the great life Jews had under the Soviet regime in order to pass the censorship. Shostakovich also wrote an orchestra version for the cycle, and completed the first 8 songs by October of 1948.

The composer's situation made a public premiere impossible until January 15, 1955, when it was performed by Shostakovich himself on piano with Nina Dorliak (soprano), Zara Dolukhanova (mezzo-soprano) and Aleksei Maslennikov (tenor). Before the premiere the work received a number of private performances. Premiere of the orchestra version was on February 19, 1964, Gennady Rozhdestvensky conducted Gorky Philharmonic Orchestra with Galina Pisarenko (soprano), Larisa Avdeyeva (mezzo-soprano) and Aleksei Maslennikov (tenor) as the soloists.

Structure 

The cycle consists of 11 songs:

 The Lament for the Dead Child. Russian translation by T. Spendiarova (1 August 1948)
 The Thoughtful Mother and Aunt. Russian translation by A. Globa (5 August 1948)
 Lullaby. Russian translation by V. Zvyagintseva (10 August 1948)
 Before a Long Parting. Russian translation by A. Globa (15 August 1948)
 A Warning. Russian translation by N. Ushakov (20 August 1948)
 The Abandoned Father. Russian translation by S. Mar (25 August 1948)
 The Song of Misery. Text by B. Shafir. Russian translation by B. Semyonov (29 August 1948)
 Winter. Russian translation by B. Semyonov (29 August 1948)
 A Good Life. Russian translation by S. Olender (10 October 1948)
 The Young Girl's Song. Russian translation by S. Olender (16 October 1948)
 Happiness. Russian translation by L. Dligach  (24 October 1948)

References and sources

External links 
Info on geocities.com
 
Song cycles by Dmitri Shostakovich
Classical song cycles in Russian
1948 compositions